Q111 may refer to:
Quran 111, al-masad, 111th chapter of the Islamic holy book
Q111, New York bus route